Gaz (also known as Gaz-e Ţāherī) is a village in Byaban Rural District, Byaban District, Minab County, Hormozgan Province, Iran. At the 2006 census, its population was 693, in 120 families.

References 

Populated places in Minab County